In model theory, a branch of mathematical logic, and in algebra, the reduced product is a construction that generalizes both direct product and ultraproduct.

Let {Si | i ∈ I} be a family of structures of the same signature σ indexed by a set I, and let U be a filter on I. The domain of the reduced product is the quotient of the Cartesian product

by a certain equivalence relation ~: two elements (ai) and (bi) of the Cartesian product are equivalent if

If U only contains I as an element, the equivalence relation is trivial, and the reduced product is just the original Cartesian product.  If U is an ultrafilter, the reduced product is an ultraproduct.

Operations from σ are interpreted on the reduced product by applying the operation pointwise. Relations are interpreted by

For example, if each structure is a vector space, then the reduced product is a vector space with addition defined as (a + b)i = ai + bi and multiplication by a scalar c as (ca)i = c ai.

References

 , Chapter 6.

Model theory